Robert L. Blalock House is a historic home located at Kinston, Lenoir County, North Carolina. It consists of the original two-story, three bay, double-pile, side-hall-plan Greek Revival style main block dated to the 1850s, and a large, two-story rear ell.  It has a one-story gable-roofed wing and a small shed-roofed room north of the rear ell and a complex arrangement of one- and two-story additions and enclosed porches to the south.  The house was renovated in the 1920s in the Classical Revival style.  It features a full-width front porch supported by groups of square-section brick columns with a round corner pavilion and porte-cochère.  It has housed a funeral home since 1947.

It was listed on the National Register of Historic Places in 1989.

References

Houses on the National Register of Historic Places in North Carolina
Greek Revival houses in North Carolina
Neoclassical architecture in North Carolina
Houses completed in 1914
Houses in Lenoir County, North Carolina
National Register of Historic Places in Lenoir County, North Carolina